Pontikaki ("little mouse") is an uninhabited islet off the coast of western Crete that is close to the islet of Pondikonisi. Administratively, it is part of the municipality Kissamos, in Chania regional unit.

See also
List of islands of Greece

Landforms of Chania (regional unit)
Uninhabited islands of Crete
Islands of Greece